This is a list of the first women lawyer(s) and judge(s) in California. It includes the year in which the women were admitted to practice law (in parentheses). Also included are women who achieved other distinctions such becoming the first in their state to graduate from law school or become a political figure.

Firsts in state history

Law School 

 Mary McHenry Keith: First female law graduate in California (1882)

Lawyers 

Clara Shortridge Foltz (1878): First female lawyer (and notary public) in California 
Christine la Barraque (c. 1906): First blind female lawyer in California
Annie Coker (1929): First African American female lawyer in California
Chiyoko Sakamoto (Takahashi) (1938): First Japanese American female lawyer in California
Emma Ping Lum (c. 1946): First Chinese American female lawyer in California 
Mary Virginia Orozco (1962): First Latino American female lawyer in California
Eleanor Nisperos (1972): First Filipino American female lawyer in California
Abby Abinanti (1974): First Native American (Yurok) female lawyer in California
Norma Samra (1986): First Indian American female lawyer in California
Vanessa Pumar (2015): First undocumented female lawyer in California

State judges 

 Clara Jess and Edna Jesse Keeran: First female Justices of the Peace respectively in California (1912; 1913)
 Georgia Bullock (1913): First female judge in California (1924)
 Annette Abbott Adams (1912): First female to serve as an appellate court judge in California (upon her appointment as a Presiding Justice of the Court of Appeal of the Third Appellate District in 1942)
Vaino Spencer (1952): First African American female judge in California (1961)
Ann H. Rutherford (1967): First female to serve as a judge in a rural county in California (Butte; 1976)
Margaret J. Morris (1953): First female to serve as an Associate Justice (1976) and Presiding Justice of the Fourth District Court of Appeal in California (1982)
Rose Bird (1966): First female to serve on the California Supreme Court (1977) and serve as its Chief Justice (1977)
Joan Klein (1955): First female to serve as a Presiding Justice in California (1978)
Frances Munoz (1972): First Latino American female judge in California (1978)
Joan Klein (1955): First female to serve as a Presiding Justice of the California Court of Appeal (1978)
 Patricia A. Yim Cowett (1972): First Chinese American female judge in California (1979)
 Arleigh M. Woods (1953): First African American female to serve on the Court of Appeals in California (1980)
 Betty Barry-Deal (1955): First female to serve on the First District Court of Appeal in California (1980)
Mary C. Morgan (1972): First openly LGBT female judge in California (1981)
Lillian Sing (1975): First Chinese American female judge in California (1981)
Pauline Hanson (1946): First female to serve on the Fifth District Court of Appeal in California (1985)
Lillian Y. Lim (1977): First Filipino American female judge in California (1986)
Patricia D. Benke (1974): First female to serve on the Fourth District Court of Appeal (1987)
Shala Sabet (1985): First Iranian American female judge in California (1993)
Kathleen Akao (1982): First Asian American female elected as a judge in California (1994)
Janice Rogers Brown (1977): First African American female to serve on the Third District Court of Appeal in California (1994)
Abby Abinanti (1974): First Native American (Yurok) female judge in California
Janice Rogers Brown (1977): First African American female to serve on the California Supreme Court (1996)
Rosemary Pfeiffer (1977): First openly LGBT (female) to serve as a Presiding Judge in California (2000)
 Tammy Chung Ryu (1987): First Korean American female judge in California (2002)
 Carol Codrington (1987): First African American female to serve on the Fourth District Court of Appeal in California (2010)
Kathleen O'Leary (1975): First female to serve as the Presiding Justice of the Fourth District Court of Appeal (2011)
Victoria Kolakowski (1991): First openly LGBT judge elected in California (2011)
Tani Cantil-Sakauye (1984): First Asian-Filipino American female to serve as the Chief Justice of the California Supreme Court (2011)
Rupa Goswami (1998): First South Asian American female judge in California (2013)
Therese M. Stewart (1982): First openly LGBT female to serve on the California Court of Appeal (2014)
Carin T. Fujisaki (1985): First Asian-Pacific Islander female to serve on the First District Court of Appeal in California (2018)
Marsha G. Slough (1987): First openly LGBT female to serve on the Fourth District Court of Appeal (2015)
Dorothy Kim (2000): First Korean American (female) to serve on the Second District Court of Appeal in California (2018)
Teri L. Jackson (1981): First African American female to serve on the First District Court of Appeal in California (2020)
Truc T. Do (1997): First Asian American (female of Vietnamese descent) to serve on the Fourth District Court of Appeal in California (2020)
Andi Mudryk: First openly LGBT judge appointed in California (2022)

Laurie Earl: First openly LGBT female to serve on the Third District Court of Appeal in California (2022)
Patricia Guerrero: First Latino American female to serve on the California Supreme Court (2022) and its Chief Justice (2023)
Pahoua C. Lor (2009): First Hmong American female appointed to serve as judge in California (2022)
Kelli Evans: First openly (African American) lesbian to serve on the California Supreme Court (2022)

Federal judges 
Shirley Hufstedler (1950): First female to serve on the U.S. Court of Appeals for the Ninth Circuit (1968)
Mariana Pfaelzer (1957): First female to serve on the U.S. District Court for the Central District of California (1978)
Saundra Brown Armstrong (1977): First African American female to serve on the United States District Court for the Northern District of California (1991)
Erithe M. Smith (1983): First African American female to serve on the United States Court of Appeals for the Ninth Circuit Court (1994)
Marilyn Hall Patel (1963): First female to serve on the U.S. District Court for the Northern District of California (1980) and its Chief Judge (1997)
Kim McLane Wardlaw (1979): First Hispanic American female to serve on the U.S. Court of Appeals for the Ninth Circuit (1998)
Consuelo B. Marshall (1962): First female (and African American female) to serve as the Chief Judge of the U.S. District Court for the Central District of California (2001)
Audrey B. Collins (1977): First African American female judge to serve as Chief Judge of the U.S. District Court for the Central District of California (2009)
Dolly M. Gee (1984): First Chinese American female to serve on the  U.S. District Court for the Central District of California (2010)
Donna Ryu: First openly LGBT female to serve on the  United States District Court for the Northern District of California (2010). She is also the first Korean American (female) judge on the court.
Jacqueline Nguyen (1991): First Vietnamese American female to serve on the U.S. District Court for the Central District of California
Yvonne Gonzalez Rogers (1991): First Latino American female justice to serve on the  U.S. District Court for the Northern District of California (2011)
Lucy H. Koh (1993): First Korean American female to serve on the  U.S. District Court for the Northern District of California (2010)
Kimberly J. Mueller (1995): First female to serve on the  U.S. District Court for the Eastern District of California (2010)
Phyllis J. Hamilton (1976): First African American female judge to serve as the Chief Judge of the U.S. District Court for the Northern District of California (2014)
Jinsook Ohta: First Asian American female (who is of Korean descent) to serve on the U.S. District Court for the Southern District of California (2021)
Sunshine Sykes (2002): First Native American (Navajo) [female] to serve on the United States District Court for the Central District of California (2022)
Holly A. Thomas (2004): First African American female to serve on the U.S. Court of Appeals for the Ninth Circuit (2022)
Ana de Alba: First Latino American female to serve as the Judge of the United States District Court for the Eastern District of California (2022)
Roopali Desai: First South Asian (female) to serve as a Judge of the United States Court of Appeals for the Ninth Circuit (upon taking oath; confirmed 2022)

Attorney General 

 Kamala Harris (1989): First (African American and Indian American) female to serve as the Attorney General of California (2011-2017)

Deputy Attorney General 

 Pauli Murray (1945): First African American female to serve as the Deputy Attorney General of California (1945)

Assistant Attorney General 

 Doris H. Maier (1935): First female Assistant Attorney General of California (1961)
 Andrea Sheridan Ordin: First female to serve as the Chief Assistant Attorney General of California (1983)

United States Attorney 

Annette Abbott Adams (1912): First female to serve as a U.S. for the Northern District of California (1918-1920)
Andrea Ordin (1966): First female appointed as the U.S. Attorney for the Central District of California (1977)
Debra Wong Yang (1986): First Asian American female appointed as the U.S. Attorney for the Central District of California (2002-2006)
Carol Lam: First Asian American female appointed as the U.S. Attorney for the Southern District of California (2002)

District Attorney 

 June Schnacke: First female to serve as a District Attorney in California (1947)
Kamala Harris (1989): First African American and Indian American female to become a District Attorney in California (2004-2010)

Deputy District Attorney 

 Clara Shortridge Foltz (1878): First female Deputy District Attorney in California (1910)
Marion L. Obera (1962): First African American female to serve as a Deputy District Attorney in California (1963)

City Attorney 

 Jayne Williams (1974): First African American female to become a City Attorney in California (1986)

Political Office 

 Roberta Achtenberg (1975): First openly LGBT female (a lawyer) appointment to a federal position was confirmed by the U.S. Senate (upon being appointed as the Assistant Secretary of the Fair Housing and Equal Opportunity Office in the U.S. Department of Housing and Urban Development in 1993)
 Sheila Kuehl (1979): First openly LGBT female member of the California legislature (1994)
Kamala Harris (1989): First female lawyer (and first African American and Indian American female) to serve as a U.S. Senator from California (2017)

Bar Association 

Joanne M. Garvey (1962): First female to serve on the State Bar of California Board of Governors (1971–1974).
 Margaret Mary Morrow (1974): First female to serve as President of the State Bar of California (1993)
Karen S. Nobumoto (c. 1989): First female of color (African/Asian American descent) to serve as the President of the State Bar of California (2001)
Holly Fujie (1978): First Asian American (female) to serve as the President of the State Bar of California (2008-2009)

Firsts in local history

Northern California 

 Lillian Sing (1975): First Chinese American female judge in Northern California (1981)

Alameda County 
 Emma Marcuse: First female to graduate from the UC Berkeley School of Law (1906)
 Marguerite Ogden: First female lawyer in Alameda County, California (c. 1913)
Eloise Cushing (1918): First female lawyer in Oakland, California. She served as the County Librarian for Alameda County Law Library (1910-1957) and ran for a judicial position in 1930.
 Cecil Mosbacher (1934): First female judge in Alameda County, California (1951)
Jacqueline Taber (1947): First female to serve on the Oakland-Piedmont Municipal Court (1965) [Alameda County, California]
Judith Ford (1974): First African American female judge in Alameda County, California (1983)
Phyllis J. Hamilton (1976): First African American (female) to serve as a Commissioner of the Alameda County Superior Court (1985)
Jayne Williams (1974): First African American female to become the City Attorney in Alameda County, California (1986)
Peggy Hora (1978): First female judge in Southern Alameda County, California (c. 1983)
Cecilia Castellanos (1978): First Latino American female judge in Alameda County, California (1997)
Jo-Lynne Q. Lee (1978): First Chinese American female to serve on the  Alameda County Superior Court (2002)
 Brenda Harbin-Forte (1979): First African American female appointed as the Presiding Judge of the Alameda County Juvenile Court (2000–2003)
 Diane Bellas (1981): First female Public Defender of Alameda County, California
Nancy E. O'Malley (1983): First female to serve as the District Attorney for Alameda County, California (2009)
Margaret Fujioka (1985): First Japanese American female judge in Alameda County, California (2017)
 Trina Thompson Stanley (1987): First African American female elected judge in Alameda County, California (2002)
Kimberly E. Colwell (1987): First openly LGBT female judge in Alameda County, California (2012)
Eumi K. Lee (2000): First Korean American female judge in Alameda County, California (2018). She is the first Korean American to serve on the bench.

Alpine County 
 Terese Drabec (1983) and Karen Dustman (1983): First females to serve consecutively as the District Attorney for Alpine County, California (2010-2015; 2015-2017). Per available online sources, Colleen E. Hemingway (1992)—who served from 1996-1998—may have been the first female District Attorney for Alpine County.

Amador County 
 Susan Harlan (1980): First female judge in Amador County, California (c. 1993)

Butte County 
 Mary King (1915): First female lawyer in Butte County, California
Ann H. Rutherford (1967): First female judge in Butte County, California (1976)
Corie J. Caraway: First Asian American (female) judge in Butte County, California (2020)

Calaveras County 
 Mora Murphy (1981): First female lawyer in Calaveras County, California
Barbara Yook (1996): First female District Attorney for Calaveras County, California (2010)
Traci L. Witry (2000): First female judge in Calaveras County, California (2018)

Colusa County 
 Edna Jesse Keeran: First female Justice of the Peace in Colusa County, California (1913)
Elizabeth “Betsy” Ufkes Olivera (1985): First female judge in Colusa County, California (2010)

Contra Costa County 
 Betsy Fitzgerald Rahn (1937): First female Judge of the Walnut Creek Municipal Court (Contra Costa County, California; 1960s)
E. Patricia Herron (1965): First female Judge of the Superior Court of Contra Costa County, California (1977)
 Bessie Dreibelbis (1962): First female Judge of the Richmond Municipal Court (Contra Costa County, California; 1970s)
 Ellen James (1970): First female Judge of the Mt. Diablo Judicial District (Contra Costa County, California; 1976)
Patricia McKinley (1975): First African American female judge in Contra Costa County, California (1982)
Barbara Zuñiga (1976): First Hispanic American female judge in Contra Costa County, California (1985)
Irene Takahashi (1977): First Asian American (female) judge in Contra Costa County, California (1989)
Diana Becton (1986): First female (and African American female) to serve as the District Attorney for Contra Costa County, California (2017)
Joni Hiramoto (1987): First Asian American (female) Judge of the Superior Court of Contra Costa County, California (1998)

Del Norte County 
 Alyce Moseley: First female municipal court judge for Crescent City, California (1950) [Del Norte County, California]
Chris Doehle (1991): First female superior court judge in Del Norte County, California (2016)

El Dorado County 
 Jean S. Klotz (1972): First female (lawyer) from El Dorado County to graduate from the McGeorge School of Law in Sacramento, California (1972)
Suzanne Kingsbury (1982): First female judge in El Dorado County, California (1996)
Dylan Sullivan: First openly LGBT (female) judge in El Dorado County, California (2014)

Glenn County 
Alicia Ekland (2007): First female to serve on the Superior Court of Glenn County, California (2018)

Humboldt County 
Elizabeth J. Morrison (1925): First female lawyer in Humboldt County, California
 Marilyn B. Miles (1980): First female judge in Humboldt County, California (1998)
Maggie Fleming (1986): First female District Attorney for Humboldt County, California (2015)

Inyo County 
Peggy Noland (1962): First female to serve as the President of the Inyo County Bar Association in California (1972)
 Susanne Rizo (2000): First female to serve on Inyo County Superior Court after election (2021)

Lake County 
 Betty Irwin (1975): First female judge in Lake County, California (1982)
Susan Krones (1984): First female District Attorney for Lake County, California (2018)
Shanda Harry (2000): First female elected as a Judge of the Lake County Superior Court, California (2018)

Lassen County 
 Gladys Spencer Burroughs (1898): First female judge in Lassen County, California (1936)
Paula A. Tennant (1955): First female to serve as the District Attorney for Lassen County, California (c. 1959)
Michele Verderosa (1996): First female (who later became a judge) to open a law practice in Susanville (2000) [Lassen County, California]

Marin County 
 Genevieve Martinelli (1915): First female prosecutor in Marin County, California (1919)
Beverly Savitt (1967) and Lynn O'Malley Taylor (1972): First female judges in Marin County, California (1983)
Paula Kamena (1982): First female District Attorney for Marin County, California (1999)
Ann Diamond (1937): First female lawyer to serve as President of the Marin County Bar Association (1975)
Dorothy Chou Proudfoot: First Asian American (female) to serve as the President of the Marin County Bar Association (2017)

Mendocino County 
 Laura Scudder (1918): First female lawyer in Ukiah, California [Mendocino County, California]
Cindee F. Mayfield (1984): First female judge in Mendocino County, California (1998)

Modoc County 
 Annette Abbott Adams (1912): One of the first females (who later became a lawyer and a judge) to serve as a school principal in California [upon becoming the Principal of Modoc County High School in 1907]

Mono County 
 In 2018, Therese M. Hankel, Esq. (1994) launched a campaign to become the first female judge in Mono County, California. She lost the election.

Napa County 
 Elizabeth "Babe" King Robinson: First female lawyer in Napa, California [Napa County, California] (1950s)
 Francisca P. Tisher (1980): First female judge in Napa County, California (1995)
 Elia Ortiz (1999): First Latino American female judge in Napa County, California (2013)
Monique Langhorne (2000): First African American female judge in Napa County, California (2019)
Allison Haley (2002): First female District Attorney for Napa County, California (2017)

Nevada County 
 Karen Gunderson: First female judge in Nevada County, California (1974)

Placer County 
 Frances Pearl Rains: First female Justice Court Judge in Foresthill, California [Placer County, California]
Laura Coffield: First female to serve as the President of the Placer County Bar Association (1969)

Plumas County 
 Janet Hilde (1985): First female judge in Plumas County, California (2006)

Sacramento County 
 Valla E. Parkinson (1914): First female lawyer in Sacramento County, California
Margaret Flynn (1937): First female judge in Sacramento County, California (1964)
Virginia S. Mueller (1947): First female Deputy District Attorney for Sacramento County, California (1959-1966)
Frances Newell Carr (1948): First female to serve on the Superior Court of Sacramento, California (1975)
Alice A. Lytle (1974): First African American female judge in Sacramento County, California (1983)
Jan Scully (1978): First female District Attorney for Sacramento County, California (1994-2014)
Emily E. Vasquez (1977): First Latino American female to serve on the Superior Court of Sacramento, California (2001)
Shama H. Mesiwala (1998): First South Asian American (female) judge in Sacramento County, California (2017)
Andi Mudryk: First openly LGBT woman to serve on the Sacramento County Superior Court, California (2022)

San Francisco (City and County) 
Clara Shortridge Foltz (1878): First female lawyer in San Francisco County, California
Mary Wetmore (1918) and Theresa Meikle (1919): First female judges respectively in San Francisco County, California (1930)
Tabytha Anderson (1933): First African American female lawyer in San Francisco County, California
Miriam Wolff (1940): First female (a lawyer and judge) to serve as the Director of the Port of San Francisco, California (1970)
Molly Minudri (1951): First female Deputy Public Defender for San Francisco County, California
Estella Dooley (1958): First African American female lawyer to work for the San Francisco Public Defender’s Office (c. 1970s)
Joanne M. Garvey (1962): First female to serve as the President of the Bar Association of San Francisco (1981)
Mary C. Morgan (1972): First openly LGBT female judge in San Francisco County, California (1981)
Lillian Sing (1975): First Chinese American female judge in San Francisco County, California (1981)
Teri L. Jackson (1981): First African American female to serve on the San Francisco County Superior Court (2002)
Therese Stewart (1982): First openly LGBT female to serve as the President of the Bar Association of San Francisco (1999)
Teresa Caffese: First female to serve as the Chief Attorney for the San Francisco Public Defender’s Office (2003)
 Suzanne Bolanos (1989): First Latina American female judge in San Francisco County, California (2003)
Kamala Harris (1989): First female District Attorney in San Francisco County (2004-2011)
Kimiko Burton (1990): First female Public Defender for San Francisco County, California (2001)
Manjari Chawla (2001): First Indian American (female) to serve on the State Bar Court [located in San Francisco] (2018)
Vedica Puri (1995): First South Asian American (female) judge in San Francisco County, California (2019)
Brooke Jenkins: First Latino American female to serve as the District Attorney of San Francisco (2022)

San Joaquin County 
Laura de Force Gordon: First female lawyer in San Joaquin County, California
 Priscilla Hope Haynes (1952): First female judge in San Joaquin County, California
Consuelo María Callahan (1975): First Hispanic American female judge in San Joaquin County, California (1992). She would later become a circuit court judge.
Emma Souza (1980): First female lawyer in Tracy, California [San Joaquin County, California]
Lauren Thomasson (1989): First African American female judge in San Joaquin County, California (2005)
Tori Verber Salazar: First female District Attorney for San Joaquin County, California (2015)

San Mateo County 
Clara Jess: First female Justice of the Peace in Daly City, California (1913) [San Mateo County, California]
Margaret Kemp (1972): First female judge in San Mateo County, California (1978)
Rosemary Pfeiffer (1977): First openly LGBT (female) judge in San Mateo County, California (1991). She was also the first openly LGBT female to serve as the Presiding Judge (2000).
Nancy Ligon de Ita (1981): First Hispanic American (female) to serve as the President of the San Mateo County Bar Association (c. 2009)
 Elizabeth Lee (1983): First Asian-Pacific American female judge in San Mateo County, California (2005)
Amarra A. Lee (2006): First African American female to serve on the San Mateo County Superior Court, California (2018)

Santa Clara County 
Clara Shortridge Foltz (1878): First female lawyer in Santa Clara County, California
Isabel Charles: First female Justice of the Peace in Santa Clara County, California (1917)
Miriam E. Wolff (1940): First female appointed as a municipal court judge in Santa Clara County, California (1975)
Marilyn Pestarino Zecher (1957): First female judge in Santa Clara County, California
Rose Bird (1966): First female Deputy Public Defender for Santa Clara County, California (1967-1974)
LaDoris Cordell (1975): First African American (female) to serve on the Santa Clara County Superior Court (1988)
Rolanda Pierre Dixon: First African American (female) to serve as an Assistant District Attorney for Santa Clara County, California
Ann Ravel (1974): First female named as the Santa Clara County Counsel (1998)
Erica Yew: First Asian American female to serve on the Superior Court of Santa Clara County, California (2001)
Katherine L. Lucero (1990): First Latino American female to serve on the Superior Court of Santa Clara County, California (2001)
Dolores Carr (1980): First female District Attorney for Santa Clara County, California (2006)
Mary Greenwood (1981): First female Public Defender for Santa Clara County, California (2005)
Risë Jones Pichon (1976): First African American female (and minority overall) to serve as the Presiding Judge of the Superior Court of Santa Clara County, California (2015)
 Nahal Iravani-Sani (1993): First Iranian American female judge in Santa Clara County, California (2017)
Audra Ibarra (1995): First Filipino American female judge in Santa Clara County, California (2018). She is also the first Filipino American to serve on the bench.
Elvira Robinson (1976): First Latino American female to serve as the Deputy District Attorney in Santa Clara County, California

Santa Cruz County 
 Lucy Underwood McCann (1894): First female lawyer in Santa Cruz County, California
June Schnacke: First female to serve as a District Attorney for Santa Cruz County, California (1947)
Heather Morse (1981): First female judge in Santa Cruz County, California
Kathleen Akao (1982): First Asian American female elected as a judge in Santa Cruz County, California (1994)

Shasta County 
 Elnora (E.) Beth Livezey (1971): First lawyer (and female) to serve as a Commissioner for Shasta County Superior Court, California (1989)
Stephanie Bridgett (2001): First female Assistant District Attorney (2015) and District Attorney (2017) for Shasta County, California

Sierra County 
 Yvette Durant (1997): First female judge in Sierra County, California (2016)

Siskiyou County 
 Jane L. (Skanderup) Edwards (1953): First female to serve as the District Attorney for Siskiyou County, California (1971-1974)
Karen L. Dixon: First female elected as a judge in Siskiyou County, California (2009)

Solano County 
 Marian Randall (née Leachman) (1940): Possibly the first female lawyer in Solano County, California
Jean E. Simpson (née Morris) (1950): First female lawyer (who was a lieutenant) to be assigned to Travis Air Force Base in Fairfield, California (1951) [Solano County, California]
 Barbara James (1973): First female magistrate in Solano County's history (1989)
 Lesli Caldwell (1979): First female Public Defender of Solano County (2010)
 Ramona Garrett (1980): First female (and first African American female) Judge of the Solano County Superior Court (1992)
 Cynda Unger (1983): First female elected as a Judge of the Solano County Superior Court (2000)
 Krishna Abrams (1993): First female District Attorney of Solano County (2014)
 Claudia Quintana (1995): First Latino American female to become the City Attorney for Vallejo, California [Solano County, California]
Bernadette Curry (1998): First female to serve as the County Counsel for Solano County (2019)
 Dora M. Rios (1999): First Latino American female Judge of the Solano County Superior Court (2017)
Kelly Trujillo (2006): First Latino American female to serve as the President of the Solano County Bar Association

Sonoma County 
 Luda Fulkerson Barham: First female lawyer in Sonoma County, California
Ellen Fleming: First female Justice of the Peace in Sonoma County, California (c. 1942)
Gayle Guynup (1976): First female judge in Sonoma County, California (1983)
Elaine Malisch Rushing: First female to serve on the Superior Court of Sonoma County (1992)
Virginia Marcoida (1977): First Latino American female to serve on the Sonoma County Superior Court (2008)
Jill Ravitch (1987): First female District Attorney for Sonoma County, California (2011)
Kathleen Pozzi (1987): First female Public Defender for Sonoma County, California (2013)
Barbara Phelan (1987): First openly LGBT female to serve on the Sonoma County Superior Court (2018)

Sutter County 
 Susan Green (1995): First female judge in Sutter County, California (2009)
Amanda Hopper (2004): First female District Attorney for Sutter County, California (2014)

Tehama County 
 Lisa Muto (1989): First female lawyer to run as a judicial candidate in Tehama County, California (2010)
Laura S. Woods (1995): First female judge in Tehama County, California (2017)

Trinity County 
 Elizabeth "Liz" Johnson (1992): First female judge in Trinity County, California (2013)
Megan Marshall and Donna Daly: First females to serve as the District Attorney for Trinity County on an interim and permanent basis respectively (2018)

Yolo County 
Gloria Megino Ochoa (1976): First Filipino American female to graduate from the UC Davis School of Law [Yolo County, California]
Donna Petre (1976): First female judge in Yolo County, California (c. 1987)
Sonia Cortés (1997): First Latino American female judge in Yolo County, California (2015)

Yuba County 
 Kathleen O'Connor (1973): First female judge in Yuba County, California (2002)

Central California

Fresno County 
 Pauline Hanson (1946): First female to serve on the Fresno County Superior Court (1979)
 Judith Leslie Soley (1971): First female to serve as the President of the Fresno County Bar Association (1986)
 Hilary A. Chittick (1979): First female to serve as the Presiding Judge of the Fresno County Superior Court (2007)
 Susan B. Andersen (1987): First female (an attorney) to serve in a countywide position (1990)
 Jane Cardoza (1981): First Hispanic American female elected to serve on the Fresno County Superior Court (1996)
 Glenda Allen-Hill (1983): First African American female judge in Fresno County, California (2008)
 Elizabeth Diaz (1990): First female Public Defender for Fresno County, California (2014)
 Elizabeth Egan (1995): First female District Attorney for Fresno County, California (2003)
 Pahoua C. Lor (2009): First Asian American female (of Hmong descent) judge in Fresno County, California (2022)

Kings County 
 Colleen Carlson (1999): First female to lead the Office of County Counsel in Kings County, California (2010)
Tonya Lee (2000): First female to serve as the Deputy District Attorney in Kings County, California (2013)

Madera County 
Marcia Putney: First female judge in Madera County, California (1945)
Sally Moreno (1995): First female District Attorney for Madera County, California (2018)

Mariposa County 
Barbara K. Shea: First female Justice of the Peace in Mariposa County, California (1918)

Merced County 
Flossie Lobo: First female to be elected judge in Merced County, California (c. 1950)
Angil Morris-Jones (1978): First African American female judge in Merced County, California (1997)
 Kimberly Reitz Helms Lewis (1997): First female elected District Attorney for Merced County, California (2018)

Monterey County 
 Elizabeth Helfrich (1959): First female lawyer in Salinas, California [Monterey County, California]
 Wendy Clark Duffy (1977): First female judge in Monterey County, California (1989)
Marla O. Anderson (1986): First African American female to become a Judge of the Monterey County Superior Court (1995)
Jeannine Pacioni (1990): First female to serve as the District Attorney for Monterey County, California (2019)
Susan Chapman (1986): Monterey County Public Defender, County of Monterey and the first woman to hold this position (2017)

San Benito County 
Lorena Johnson: First female Justice of the Peace in San Benito County, California (c. 1947)
Jean Flanagan: First female lawyer in San Benito County, California (upon opening her own law practice in Hollister in 1975)
Candace Hooper: First female to serve as the District Attorney for San Benito County, California (2006)

Stanislaus County 
Esto Bates Broughton (1916): First female lawyer in Stanislaus County, California
Ann Veneman (1976): First female to serve as the Deputy Public Defender in Stanislaus County, California (1978)
Susan D. Siefken: First female to serve as the President of the Stanislaus County Bar Association (1989)
Dawna Frenchie Reeves (1995): First African American (female) judge in Stanislaus County, California (2008)
Birgit Fladager (1986): First elected female District Attorney of Stanislaus County, California (2006)

Tulare County 
Anna White Garlund (1944): First female lawyer in Tulare County, California
Melinda M. Reed (1979) and Elisabeth B. Krant-Latronico (1980): Per available sources, the first females to serve respectively as municipal court judges in Tulare County, California (1993-1995). They would both later become superior court judges in 1998.
Lisa Bertolino (1988): First female Public Defender for Tulare County, California (2014)

Tuolumne County 
Eleanor Provost (1976): First female to serve as the Deputy District Attorney for Tuolumne County, California (1977-1982). She later became a judge.
Cherie Spitze (1994): First female President of the Tuolumne County Bar Association (2015)

Southern California 
Betty Tom Chu (1961): First Chinese American female lawyer in Southern California 
Denise de Bellefeuille (1981): First female judge on the South Coast in California (c. 1993)

Imperial County 
 Annie M. Gutierrez (1972): First female (and Latino American female) judge in Imperial County, California (2002)
Diane Altamirano (1977): First female to serve as the Presiding Judge for the Superior Court of Imperial County, California (2018)
Katherine Kmiec Turner (2007): First female County Counsel for Imperial County, California (2015)

Kern County 
 Ellen Miller (1936): First female judge in Kern County, California (1957). She is reputed to be the first female lawyer in Bakersfield, California. [Kern County, California]
Lisa Green (1983): First female to serve as the District Attorney for Kern County, California (2010)
Raymonda Burnham (1996): First female public defender and criminal defense lawyer to be appointed a Judge of the Kern County Superior Court (2008)
 Gloria J. Cannon (1996): First African American female judge in Kern County, California (2017)
Pam Singh (2004): First female Public Defender for Kern County, California (2017)
Judith K. Dulcich (1990) and Colette M. Humphrey (1984): First females to serve simultaneously as the Presiding Judge and Assistant Presiding Judge respectively for Kern County Superior Court (2019)
Wendy L. Avila: First Latino American female judge in Kern County, California (2021)
Alekxia Torres-Stallings (2014): First Latino American female to serve as the President of the Kern County Bar Association (2021). Torres-Stalling and her father David A. Torres are the first father and daughter to have served as county bar president.

Los Angeles County 
Clara Shortridge Foltz (1878): First female Deputy District Attorney for Los Angeles County, California (1910)
Elizabeth Kenney (1897): First female lawyer in Los Angeles, California [Los Angeles County, California]
Orfa Jean Shontz (1913): First female referee of the Juvenile Court of Los Angeles County, California (1915-1920)
Georgia Bullock (1913): First female judge in Los Angeles County, California (1931)
May Darlington Lahey (1914): First female (who was Australian) to serve as the Presiding Judge of the Los Angeles Municipal Court (c. 1943)
Mabel Walker Willebrandt (1917): First female Public Defender of Los Angeles County, California (c. 1920s)
Vaino Spencer (1952): First African American female judge in Los Angeles County, California (1961)
Marion L. Obera (1962): First African American female to serve as a Deputy District Attorney in California (1963)
Consuelo B. Marshall (1962): First female (and African American female) to work in the City Attorney's Office for Los Angeles (1962)
Patricia Phillips (1968): First female to serve as the President of the Los Angeles County Bar Association, California (1984)
Ramona Perez (1972): First Latino American female judge in Los Angeles County, California (1985)
Maxine F. Thomas (1972): First African American female appointed as a Presiding Judge of Los Angeles Municipal Court (1987)
Miriam Krinsky: First (female) lawyer from the public sector to serve as the President of the Los Angeles County Bar Association, California (2002)
Lee S. Edmon: First female to serve as the Assistant Presiding Judge (2009-2010) and Presiding Judge (2011-2012) of Los Angeles County Superior Court
Carol L. Newman (1979): First openly LGBT female to serve as the San Fernando Valley Bar Association, Los Angeles County, California (2015)
Jackie Lacey (1982): First female (and African American female) District Attorney for Los Angeles County, California (2012)
Maria Rohaidy (1989): First Hispanic American (female) to serve as the President of the Long Beach Bar Association, Los Angeles County, California (2009)
Jacqueline Nguyen (1991): First Vietnamese American female judge in Los Angeles County, California (2002)

Orange County 
 Clara Cushman (1922): First female lawyer in Orange County, California
 Celia Young Baker (1948): First female judge in Orange County, California (1948)
Betty Lou Lamoreaux (1957): First female to serve on the Superior Court of Orange County, California (1976)
Alicemarie Stotler (1967): First female lawyer to work in the Orange County District Attorney's Office
Frances Munoz (1972): First Latino American (female) lawyer hired by the Public Defender's Office in Orange County, California
Heidi Mueller (1975): First female lawyer to practice criminal defense full-time in Orange County, California (1977)
Karen Robinson (1989): First African American female judge in Orange County, California (2003)
 Cristina L. Talley (1982): First Latino American female to become the City Attorney for Anaheim, California [Orange County, California] (2009)
Sheila Hanson (1989): First Iranian American (female) judge in Orange County, California (2006)
Lei Lei Wang Ekvall (1992): First Asian American female to serve as the President of the Orange County Bar Association (2010)

Riverside County 
 Mary McFarland Hall (1934): Reputed to be the first female lawyer in Riverside County, California
 Janice McIntyre (1975): First female judge in Riverside County, California (1981)
Irma Poole Asberry (1979): First African American female judge in Riverside County, California (2007)
Raquel A. Marquez-Britsch (1991): First Latino American female judge in Riverside County, California (2011) and San Bernardino County, California
 Susanne Cho (1993): First Korean American female judge in Riverside County, California (2014)
 Sunshine Sykes (2002): First Native American (Navajo) female judge in Riverside County, California (2013)

San Bernardino County 
 Grace Storey Merlo: First female Deputy Public Defender for San Bernardino County, California (c. 1957)
Margaret J. Morris (1953): First female judge in San Bernardino County, California (1963)
Katrina West (1990); First African American (female) to serve on the San Bernardino County Superior Court (2001)
Raquel A. Marquez-Britsch (1991): First Latino American female judge in Riverside County, California (2011) and San Bernardino County, California
Doreen Boxer (1993): First female Public Defender for San Bernardino County, California (2006-2010)
Lily L. Sinfield (1998): First Asian-Pacific Islander female judge in San Bernardino County, California (2012)
Candice Garcia-Rodrigo: First Latino American female elected judge in San Bernardino County, California (2021)

San Diego County 
Clara Shortridge Foltz (1878): First female lawyer in San Diego County, California 
Madge Bradley (1933): First female judge in San Diego County, California (1953)
Patricia A. Yim Cowett (1972): First Chinese American female judge in San Diego County, California (1979)
 Elizabeth Riggs (1974): First African American female judge in San Diego County, California (1979)
 Randa Trapp: First African American (female) judge to serve in the Civil Division and as its Supervising Judge
 Melinda Lasatar (1973): First female to serve as the President of the San Diego County Bar Association (1985)
 Irma Elsa Gonzalez: First Latino American female judge in San Diego County, California (1991)
Bonnie Dumanis (1977): First Jewish and openly LGBT female District Attorney of San Diego [San Diego County, California] (2003)
Tamila Ebrahimi Ipema: First Iranian American (female) judge in San Diego County, California (2009)
Mara Elliott (1994): First Latina American female lawyer elected as City Attorney for San Diego, California (2016)
Truc T. Do (1997): First Vietnamese American (female) judge in San Diego County, California (2018)
Marcella "Marcy" McLaughlin (1999): First Latina American female to serve as the President of the San Diego County Bar Association (c. 2013)

San Luis Obispo County 
 Teresa Estrada-Mullaney (1979): First female (and Latino American female) Deputy District Attorney and judge in San Luis Obispo County, California (1981 and 1992, respectively)

Santa Barbara County 
 Deborah Talmage (1976): First female commissioner in Santa Barbara County, California (1983)
Barbara J. Beck (1974): First female judge in Santa Barbara County, California (1985)
Christie Stanley (1978): First female to serve as the District Attorney for Santa Barbara County, California (2006)
Von T. Nguyen Deroian (2006): First Asian-Pacific Islander (female) judge in Santa Barbara County, California (2018)
Denise Hippach: First African American (female) judge in Santa Barbara County, California (2022)
Kay Kuns: First female lawyer from Santa Ynez Valley to become a Judge of the Superior Court of Santa Barbara (2009)
Patricia L. Kelly: First female to serve as the Presiding Judge of the Superior Court of Santa Barbara County, California (2017-2018)
Elizabeth Diaz: First Hispanic American (female) to serve as the President of the Santa Barbara County Bar Association (2020)

Ventura County 
 Alice Titus Magill (1908): First female lawyer in Ventura County, California (1938)
 Melinda Johnson (1972): First female judge (1982) and Presiding Judge (1993) in Ventura County, California
Michele M. Castillo (2002): First Latino American/Filipino American female judge in Ventura County, California (2016)

See also  

 List of first women lawyers and judges in the United States
 Timeline of women lawyers in the United States
 Women in law

Other topics of interest 

 List of first minority male lawyers and judges in the United States
 List of first minority male lawyers and judges in California

References 

Lawyers, California, first
American women judges
California, first
Women, first
Women, California, first
Women in California
Lists of people from California
Legal history of California
Political history of California
Social history of California
History of women in California